Mike Smith (born June 13, 1959) is a former American football coach. He is a former head coach of the NFL's Atlanta Falcons, a position he held from 2008 to 2014. He previously served as the defensive coordinator for the Jacksonville Jaguars between 2003 and 2007. During his tenure as the head coach of the Falcons, Smith became the franchise's winningest head coach by number of wins in addition to being the recipient of the 2008 NFL Coach of the Year Award by the Associated Press and was also voted NFL Coach of the Year Award by the Sporting News in 2008, 2010 and 2012.

Early years
Raised in Daytona Beach, Florida, Smith played linebacker at Father Lopez Catholic High School, earning all-state honors. He played collegiately for East Tennessee State University between 1977 and 1981, and was chosen as defensive MVP twice. He briefly played professionally for the Winnipeg Blue Bombers of the Canadian Football League, for the 1982 season, before retiring as a player.

Coaching career

College Coaching

Smith decided to take up coaching after his playing days were over, starting in various assistant capacities with several Division I colleges before moving on to the NFL: San Diego State (1982–1985), Morehead State (1986) and Tennessee Tech (1987–1998).

Baltimore Ravens and Jacksonville Jaguars

His first NFL job was as defensive assistant/defensive line coach for the Baltimore Ravens in 1999 under defensive line coach Rex Ryan for three seasons. In 2002, he was promoted to linebackers' coach for head coach Brian Billick, tutoring such future standouts as Ray Lewis, Peter Boulware, Jamie Sharper and Adalius Thomas, and in that capacity helped the 2000 Ravens win Super Bowl XXXV. On January 21, 2003, he was again promoted, moving on to be defensive coordinator of the Jacksonville Jaguars for incoming head coach Jack Del Rio.

Atlanta Falcons

In 2008, Smith became head coach for the first time at any level, taking charge of the Atlanta Falcons and starting off his first season by installing rookie Matt Ryan as starting quarterback to open the season against the Detroit Lions. In his debut as an NFL head coach, his Falcons beat the Lions 34–21. Atlanta's 216 yards of total offense in the first quarter was the highest in over two decades, eclipsing their October 13, 1991 mark of 172 yards against San Francisco. His first loss, against the Tampa Bay Buccaneers, was mitigated by winning his first coach's challenge, on the spotting of the ball after a Roddy White reception in the third quarter, giving the Falcons a first down and keeping the drive alive. Stars like Michael Turner, Roddy White, Michael Jenkins and John Abraham helped him carry the Falcons to their first playoff berth since 2004, although they lost fairly narrowly to the eventual NFC champion Arizona Cardinals in the wild-card round of the 2008 NFL playoffs. He was named the 2008 AP Coach of the year and NFL Coach of the Year, beating out Miami Dolphins head coach Tony Sparano in the voting.

In his second season, Smith and the Falcons overcame a difficult schedule and several key injuries (to QB Ryan and RB Turner) to end up with a 9–7 finish and second place in the NFC South. While they failed to reach the playoffs, this marked the first time the team had ever had back-to-back winning seasons.

In 2010, he led the Falcons to a NFC-best season record of 13–3, earning the team's second NFC South title and fourth divisional championship overall before being beaten at home by the eventual Super Bowl XLV champions, the Green Bay Packers, 48–21 in the NFC Divisional Round.

The 2011 season ended with another winning record (10–6) and Smith's third playoff appearance (a first-round loss, by another eventual Super Bowl champion, the New York Giants).

In 2012 Smith led the Falcons to a league best 13–3 record and recorded his first win in the postseason as Falcons head coach, edging the Seattle Seahawks 30–28 in the 2012 NFC Divisional Playoffs. With the win, Atlanta also made their 3rd all-time appearance in the NFC Championship Game, and hosted the game for the first time in their history against the San Francisco 49ers. The Falcons were beaten 28–24 after taking the lead 10–0 in the 1st Quarter. Also in the 2012 season, Smith earned his 50th win by defeating the Philadelphia Eagles on October 28, passing Dan Reeves as the best-performing coach in Falcons history by number of wins.  Smith reached 50 wins in 71 games, which is good for 3rd best all-time since the AFL-NFL merger in 1970, surpassed only by Chuck Knox who earned his 50th win in 65 games and by George Seifert in 62 games.

Smith was named Sporting News 2012 Coach of the Year for the 3rd time by a pool of 27 NFL coaches and executives.

In the 2013 season, the Falcons slumped to a 4–12 record, and Smith was eventually named the head coach of the North Team in the 2014 Senior Bowl.

On December 28, 2014, multiple media outlets reported that the Falcons had hired Korn Ferry, a reputed firm, to assist in finding potential candidates to replace Smith should he be fired.  Later that day, the Falcons lost to the Carolina Panthers 34–3.  The game determined the NFC South champion, despite both teams having a losing record. On December 29, 2014, Smith was fired, after two losing seasons in a row.

Tampa Bay Buccaneers

On January 15, 2016, Smith was named the defensive coordinator for the Tampa Bay Buccaneers, under former assistant Dirk Koetter, who was named the Buccaneers' head coach that same day. On October 15, 2018, Smith was fired after leading Tampa Bay to the league's worst defense through the first six weeks of the season.

Head coaching record

Hula Bowl
In January 2022, Smith coached Team Aina in the Hula Bowl, a college football postseason all-star game. He returned as head coach of the same squad in 2023.

Personal life
Smith is the oldest of eight children. Mike and his wife, Julie, have one daughter, Logan. Mike is the brother-in-law of former NFL head coach Brian Billick.

References

1959 births
Living people
American football linebackers
Atlanta Falcons head coaches
Baltimore Ravens coaches
East Tennessee State Buccaneers football players
Jacksonville Jaguars coaches
Morehead State Eagles football coaches
National Football League defensive coordinators
San Diego State Aztecs football coaches
Sportspeople from Chicago
Sportspeople from Daytona Beach, Florida
Tampa Bay Buccaneers coaches
Tennessee Tech Golden Eagles football coaches
Winnipeg Blue Bombers players
Players of American football from Chicago